Bibliothèque François Mitterrand is a station of the Paris Métro and RER, named after the former French president, François Mitterrand, and serving the area surrounding the new building of the Bibliothèque nationale de France (BnF), whose site near the station is also named after Mitterrand, and the Paris Diderot University. It is a transfer point between Line 14 of the Paris Metro and the RER C. It is situated on the Paris–Bordeaux railway.

History
The Bibliothèque François Mitterrand station opened in 1998 when Line 14 was first opened. Its architect is Antoine Grumbach, a different architect from the other Line 14 metro stations.

From the opening of Line 14 until 25 June 2007, this station functioned as the line's southern terminus. Further work extended the line to a new station to the southwest, Olympiades, which opened on 26 June 2007.

It is expected that the Line 14 will be extended to Orly Airport. As of Mars 2021, the tunnels have been dug.

The station Masséna of the RER C closed when the Bibliothèque François Mitterrand station opened, to allow for the transfer of passengers between the metro and RER lines.

Nearby attractions
This station serves the area known as Tolbiac, between the Seine and the train tracks of the network of the Gare d'Austerlitz, which includes the BnF and the headquarters of the Réseau Ferré de France, the French equivalent of the UK's Network Rail), and the BnF's large new cinema, etc.

From this station, within walking distance is the church of Notre-Dame de la Gare, rue de Domrémy, on the Place Jeanne-d'Arc.

Station layout 

The RER station comprises three island platforms and six tracks.

 The two most easterly tracks (Voies E and F) are southbound for the RER C.
 The two central tracks (Voies C and D) and their platforms are used in exceptional cases for the rerouting of the RER C trains at Gare d'Austerlitz. Normally the tracks are used by main lines.
 The two most westerly tracks (Voies A and B) are for the RER C direction North towards Gare d'austerlitz.

Gallery

See also
List of stations of the Paris Métro
List of stations of the Paris RER

External links

 
 

Accessible Paris Métro stations
Paris Métro stations in the 13th arrondissement of Paris
Réseau Express Régional stations
François Mitterrand
Railway stations in France opened in 1998